Xito is a Java based portable desktop environment. It claims to be committed to creating and developing an open-source desktop that will "introduce a new level of functionality and usability to internet based software applications." Since Java has large performance and space requirements the Xito desktop environment is currently trying to address these problems.

See also 
 Yahoo! Widget Engine

References 

 Xito BootStrap 1.0.0 released

External links 
 Project Homepage

Free desktop environments
Free software programmed in Java (programming language)